Blaengarw railway station served the village of Blaengarw, in the historical county of Glamorgan, Wales, from 1902 to 1953 on the Garw Valley Railway.

History 
The station was opened to the public on 26 May 1902, although it was open earlier for miners in 1877. To the north was international colliery. The station closed on 9 February 1953. The colliery closed in 1968.

References

External links 

Disused railway stations in Bridgend County Borough
Former Great Western Railway stations
Railway stations in Great Britain opened in 1902
Railway stations in Great Britain closed in 1953
1877 establishments in Wales
1953 disestablishments in Wales